Nelson Pizarro (born July 8, 1985) is an American soccer player who is currently a coach with the San Diego Surf Academy.

Career

College and amateur

Pizarro played college soccer for Lincoln Memorial University. His style of attacking football was adored by fans. The reason for this is growing up Nelson never played 11 aside soccer instead learning the game at his family's indoor and 5 aside facility in Florida. He played with adults at a very young age and became a very technically gifted player with strength to match.

He regularly scored goals in big matches and could be utilized by the coaching staff in many positions including central defence and as a wide midfielder or full back. However, his most effective position is an attacking midfielder due to his technical ability and effective runs into the box.

As a sophomore at Lincoln he won several awards including a Gulf South Conference Championship. In his upperclassman career he won more awards including All-American honors as he captained the team to not only another conference championship, this time the South Atlantic Conference, but two regional championships, a final four berth in 2006 and in his last game at the University the National Championship final against Franklin Pierce University in 2007.

During his college years, Pizarro also played in the USL Premier Development League for Ventura County Fusion,

Professional
Pizarro was signed to a developmental contract by Kansas City Wizards on April 30, 2008 after impressing head coach Curt Onalfo and GM Peter Vermes during a two-day open tryout . He made his full professional debut for the Wizards on 8 July 2008, in a US Open Cup quarterfinal game against the Seattle Sounders.

He was released by the Wizards in May 2010. He later signed midway through the season with USL-1 side Miami FC, and played the remainder of the season for the Blues.

Having been unable to sign with a professional club elsewhere, Pizarro moved to California to play an exhibition season with the reborn San Diego Flash in 2011, in preparation for their return to full competition in 2011.

References

External links
Miami FC bio
MLS player profile
Lincoln Memorial University news article on signing

American soccer players
Sporting Kansas City players
Miami FC (2006) players
Ventura County Fusion players
Major League Soccer players
USL First Division players
1985 births
Living people
USL League Two players
Lincoln Memorial University alumni
People from Pembroke Pines, Florida
Soccer players from Florida
USL Championship players
Orange County SC players
Association football midfielders